James C. Sanders (November 7, 1926 – March 31, 2018) was an American businessman who served as Administrator of the Small Business Administration from 1982 to 1986.

References

1926 births
2018 deaths
Administrators of the Small Business Administration
California Republicans